Cyrtodactylus thathomensis,  also known as the Thathom bent-toed gecko, is a species of gecko endemic to Laos.

References

Cyrtodactylus
Reptiles described in 2018
Endemic fauna of Laos
Reptiles of Laos